Podrinje (Serbian Cyrillic: Подриње) is the Slavic name of the Drina river basin, known in English as the Drina Valley. The Drina basin is shared between Bosnia and Herzegovina and Serbia, with majority of its territory being located in Eastern Bosnia, entire Upper Drina course and majority of the Middle course, while the Lower Drina course is shared between two countries,with the river representing border. The part of the Drina basin located in Bosnia and Herzegovina is also called Eastern Bosnia.

History

Between 1918 and 1922, Podrinje District, with its seat in Šabac, was one of the districts of the Kingdom of Serbs, Croats and Slovenes. The district comprised the north-western part of present-day Šumadija and Western Serbia. Between 1922 and 1929, Podrinje Oblast existed in roughly the same area also with its seat in Šabac. In 1929, a large province of the Kingdom of Yugoslavia known as the Drina Banovina was formed with its capital in Sarajevo. Drina Banovina included western parts of present-day Serbia and eastern parts of present-day Bosnia and Herzegovina. Following World War II Axis occupation in 1941, the province was abolished and its territory was divided between the Independent State of Croatia and the area governed by the Nazi Germany Military Administration in Serbia.

In 1941 Yugoslav Partisans liberated the large western part of the German occupied territory. In this territory they proclaimed the Republic of Užice (Uzička Republika) with Užice city as the centre of the Republic. This large free territory was an island of freedom in Nazi occupied Europe. The Republic of Užice was short-lived. German troops occupied the territory again, while the majority of Partisan forces escaped towards Bosnia. During the WWII Genocide of Serbs by the Croatian fascist Ustaše regime, many Serbs were executed along the Drina Valley for months, especially near Višegrad. Jure Francetić's Black Legion killed thousands of defenceless Bosnian Serb civilians and threw their bodies into the Drina river.

When the Bosnian War broke out in 1992, the Drina Valley became the focus of a bitter campaign of ethnic cleansing by Army of Republika Srpska forces which eventually culminated in the Srebrenica massacres in July 1995.

According to the Sarajevo Research and Documentation Centre (RDC/IDC) Bosnian Atlas of the Dead Project, the Podrinje was the area of Bosnia which suffered the highest number of casualties. In 2007, Mirsad Tokaca, the RDC/IDC's director, reported that 28,666 deaths of a total of 97,207 recorded by June 2007, had occurred in the Podrinje.

Today, one of the cantons in Bosnia and Herzegovina is known as Bosnian Podrinje Canton.

Towns in Podrinje
Cities and towns in Bosnia and Herzegovina (Republika Srpska and Bosnian-Podrinje Canton Goražde):
 Bratunac
 Čajniče
 Foča
 Goražde
 Rogatica
 Rudo
 Sapna
 Srebrenica
 Višegrad
 Zvornik

Cities and towns in Serbia (Mačva District and Zlatibor District):
 Bajina Bašta
 Banja Koviljača
 Ljubovija
 Loznica
 Mali Zvornik

See also
 Bosnian-Podrinje Canton
 Geographical regions in Serbia
 Drina Banovina
 Drina
 Posavina

References

Regions of Bosnia and Herzegovina
Geographical regions of Serbia
Historical counties of Bosnia and Herzegovina
Zemljas of the medieval Bosnian state